The Gold Diggers is a Warner Bros. silent comedy film directed by Harry Beaumont with screenplay by Grant Carpenter based on the play The Gold Diggers by Avery Hopwood which ran for 282 performances on Broadway in 1919 and 1920.  Both the play and the film were produced by David Belasco. The film stars Hope Hampton, Wyndham Standing, and Louise Fazenda.  It was also the (uncredited) film debut of Louise Beavers.

The story of The Gold Diggers was filmed again as a talkie in 1929 as Gold Diggers of Broadway, which is now lost, and also in 1933 as Gold Diggers of 1933, with musical numbers created by Busby Berkeley.  Three other sequels followed: Gold Diggers of 1935 (1935), Gold Diggers of 1937 (1936), and Gold Diggers in Paris (1938).

Plot
Wally Saunders (Johnny Harron) wants to marry chorus girl Violet Dayne (Anne Cornwall), but his uncle, Stephen Lee (Wyndham Standing) thinks that all chorines are gold diggers (people who date others to get money from them) and refuses to give his approval.  Violet's friend Jerry La Mar (Hope Hampton) is not a gold digger, but she agrees to go after Lee so aggressively that Violet will look tame by comparison.  Of course, the uncle and the friend fall in love and get married, even after he knows the truth about her, and he gives permission for Wally and Violet to get hitched too.

Cast

Box office
According to Warner Bros records the film earned $470,000 domestically and $31,000 foreign.

Preservation
With no prints of The Gold Diggers located in any archive it was for decades presumed to be a lost film. In May 2021, a collector found an incomplete nitrate 35mm Belgian print in England, which has been uploaded to YouTube. The surviving footage includes reels 1,4,5 and 6, although some of the extant reels have missing sections at the beginning and end of the reels. In June 2021 the same collector uploaded a digitally scanned version of the first five minutes to YouTube, with plans to scan the remaining footage.

See also
• List of incomplete films

References

External links

Annette Bochenek (2019), Hometowns to Hollywood: The Gold Diggers (1923),  with stills

1923 films
American silent feature films
American black-and-white films
1920s English-language films
Films about musical theatre
Films directed by Harry Beaumont
Warner Bros. films
American films based on plays
1923 comedy films
Silent American comedy films
Rediscovered American films
1920s rediscovered films
1920s American films